Here I Am is the fifth album by American singer Dionne Warwick, released on December 21, 1965 by Scepter Records.  The LP was produced by Burt Bacharach and Hal David.  This album, as was usually the case until 1968, was recorded at Bell Sound Studios in New York City.

History
The album's lead single, the title track "Here I Am", was featured in the film What's New, Pussycat? Despite this, the single failed to make the Top 40 in the U.S. The follow-up, "Looking With My Eyes", was prominently featured on the dance show "Hullabaloo", but did not make the chart either.

The third single from the album, "Are You There (With Another Girl)" was released in December 1965, and became a hit, making the Top 40.

Several early copies of the album had errors in the album cover, listing tracks such as "It's Love That Really Counts" that were not included on the album itself.  Other notable songs featured on the album are the bouncy "Window Wishing", the hauntingly beautiful "If I Ever Make You Cry" and "This Little Light" which featured Warwick herself on the piano.

Track listing

Charts

Singles

References

External links
Here I Am at Discogs

Dionne Warwick albums
1965 albums
Albums produced by Burt Bacharach
Albums produced by Hal David
Scepter Records albums